Aphram Melki (born 1959) is a Swedish politician. From October 2021 to September 2022, he served as Member of the Riksdag representing the constituency of Stockholm County. He became a member after Per Lodenius resigned.

References 

Living people
1959 births
Place of birth missing (living people)
Members of the Riksdag from the Centre Party (Sweden)
Members of the Riksdag 2018–2022